Rosemary Crompton,  (née Baxendale; 22 April 1942 – 17 August 2011) was a British sociologist and academic, specialising in gender and social class. She was Professor of Sociology at City University from 1999 to 2008: she was then appointed professor emeritus. She had previously been a research assistant at the University of Cambridge, a lecturer at the University of East Anglia and at the University of Kent, and held a chair at the University of Leicester.

Honours
In 2007, Crompton was elected a Fellow of the British Academy (FBA), the United Kingdom's national academy for the humanities and social sciences.

Selected works

References

1942 births
2011 deaths
British sociologists
British women sociologists
Academics of the University of Cambridge
Academics of the University of East Anglia
Academics of the University of Kent
Academics of the University of Leicester
Academics of City, University of London
Fellows of the British Academy